is a railway station in the city of  Tahara, Aichi Prefecture, Japan, operated by the  Public–private partnership Toyohashi Railroad.

Lines
Mikawa Tahara Station is a terminal station of the Atsumi Line, and is located 18.0 kilometers from the opposing terminus of the line at Shin-Toyohashi Station.

Station layout
The station has two bay platforms, with an adjacent station building. The station building is staffed.

Platforms

Adjacent stations

|-
!colspan=5|Toyohashi Railroad

Station history
The station name was changed to its present name in 1927. On April 10, 1926, the line was extended to Kurokawahara. The Atsumi Railroad was merged into the Nagoya Railroad on September 1, 1940. The section from Mikawa Tahara to Kurokawahara was discontinued on June 5, 1944. The Toyohashi Railroad Company was established on October 1, 1954. In October 1994, a new station building was completed. A modern station building was completed on October 27, 2013.

Passenger statistics
In fiscal 2016, the station was used by an average of 1,480 passengers daily.

Surrounding area
Tahara Castle
Tahara City Hall

See also
 List of railway stations in Japan

References

External links

Toyohashi Railway Official home page

Railway stations in Japan opened in 1924
Tahara, Aichi
Railway stations in Aichi Prefecture